Mitromorpha olivoidea is a species of sea snail, a marine gastropod mollusk in the family Mitromorphidae.

Description
The length varies from 6 mm to 10 mm.

Distribution
THis species occurs in the Mediterranean Sea off France, Spain, Algeria and Capri; also off Morocco.

References

 Cantraine, F. J. (1835). [Diagnoses ou descriptiones succinctes de quelques espèces nouvelles de mollusques]. Bulletin de l'Académie Royale des Sciences et Belles-lettres de Bruxelles. 2(11): 380–401
 Calcara P. (1841). Memoria sopra alcune conchiglie fossili rinvenute nella contrada d'Altavilla. Palermo, Antonio Muratori 86 p., 1 pl.
 Mifsud C. (1993). Due nuove specie di gasteropodi di Malta. La Conchiglia 266: 14–17, 28 page(s): 15–17
 Gofas, S.; Le Renard, J.; Bouchet, P. (2001). Mollusca. in: Costello, M.J. et al. (eds), European Register of Marine Species: a check-list of the marine species in Europe and a bibliography of guides to their identification. Patrimoines Naturels. 50: 180–213

External links
 Locard A. (1891). Les coquilles marines des côtes de France. Annales de la Société Linnéenne de Lyon. 37: 1–38
  Amati B., Smriglio C. & Oliverio M. (2015). Revision of the Recent Mediterranean species of Mitromorpha Carpenter, 1865 (Gastropoda, Conoidea, Mitromorphidae) with the description of seven new species. Zootaxa. 3931(2): 151–195
 
 

olivoidea
Gastropods described in 1835